The Democratic-Social Movement (RDS) was a political party in Poland.

History
The RDS was established on 20 April 1991 by Zbigniew Bujak as a breakaway from the Citizens' Movement for Democratic Action. It went on to receive 0.5% of the vote and win one seat in the Sejm in the October 1991 parliamentary elections.

In June 1992 the party merged with the Polish Social Democratic Union, Labour Solidarity and some members of the Polish Socialist Party to form Labour United.

References

1991 establishments in Poland
1992 disestablishments in Poland
Defunct social democratic parties in Poland
Political parties disestablished in 1992
Political parties established in 1991